Gale Hansen (born 1960)  is an American film and television actor best known for playing Charlie Dalton in Dead Poets Society.

Filmography

References

External links
 
 

1960 births
American male film actors
American male television actors
Living people